Veronica Hardy (born October 30, 1995) is a Venezuelan mixed martial artist (MMA) who competes in the women’s Flyweight division in the Ultimate Fighting Championship (UFC).

Mixed martial arts career

Early career
Hardy amassed a record of 5–0 prior to being signed by UFC.

Ultimate Fighting Championship 
Hardy faced Ashlee Evans-Smith on September 3, 2016 at UFC Fight Night 93. She lost the fight via technical knockout in round three.

Hardy faced Andrea Lee on May 19, 2018 at UFC Fight Night 129. She lost the fight by unanimous decision.  This fight earned her the Fight of the Night bonus.

Hardy faced Gillian Robertson on February 23, 2019 at UFC Fight Night: Błachowicz vs. Santos. She lost the fight via submission in the second round.

Hardy was scheduled to face Rachael Ostovich on August 10, 2019 at UFC on ESPN+ 14. However, it was announced on July 29, 2019 that Ostovich was replaced by Polyana Viana for undisclosed reason. Macedo won the fight via a submission in round one. This win earned her the Performance of the Night award.

Hardy was scheduled to face Amanda Lemos on December 21, 2019 at UFC on ESPN+ 23. However, her bout with Amanda Lemos was cancelled and she was scheduled to face Ariane Lipski on November 16, 2019 at UFC on ESPN+ 22, replacing Priscila Cachoeira who was tested positive for a diuretic. In turn Hardy was not cleared to fight by the Brazilian athletic commission due to severe headaches one day before the fight was taken place and she was replaced by newcomer Isabella de Padua.

Hardy faced Bea Malecki on March 14, 2020 at UFC Fight Night 170. She lost the fight via unanimous decision.

After the bout, Hardy retired from MMA due to concussion issues. 

After over three years since her last bout, Hardy returned on March 18, 2023 at UFC 286 against Juliana Miller. She won the fight by unanimous decision.

Personal life 
Hardy married former UFC fighter Dan Hardy on December 25, 2022.

Championships and awards

Mixed martial arts 
Ultimate Fighting Championship
Fight of the Night (One time) 
Performance of the Night (One time)

Mixed martial arts record

  
|-
|Win
|align=center|7–4–1
|Juliana Miller
|Decision (unanimous)
|UFC 286
|
|align=center|3
|align=center|5:00
|London, England
|
|-
|Loss
|align=center|6–4–1
|Bea Malecki
|Decision (unanimous)
|UFC Fight Night: Lee vs. Oliveira 
|
|align=center|3
|align=center|5:00
|Brasília, Brazil
|
|-
|Win
|align=center| 6–3–1
|Polyana Viana
|Submission (armbar)
|UFC Fight Night: Shevchenko vs. Carmouche 2 
|
|align=center|1
|align=center|1:09
|Montevideo, Uruguay
|
|-
| Loss
| align=center| 5–3–1
| Gillian Robertson
| Submission (rear-naked choke)
| UFC Fight Night: Błachowicz vs. Santos
| 
| align=center| 2
| align=center| 3:27
| Prague, Czech Republic
| 
|-
| Loss
| align=center| 5–2–1
| Andrea Lee
| Decision (unanimous)
| UFC Fight Night: Maia vs. Usman
| 
| align=center| 3
| align=center| 5:00
| Santiago, Chile
| 
|-
| Loss
| align=center| 5–1–1
| Ashlee Evans-Smith
| TKO (elbows)
|UFC Fight Night: Arlovski vs. Barnett
| 
| align=center| 3
| align=center| 2:46
| Hamburg, Germany
| 
|-
| Draw
| align=center| 5–0–1
| Irén Rácz
| Draw (majority)
| Innferno Fighting Championship 2
| 
| align=center| 3
| align=center| 5:00
| Kufstein, Austria
| 
|-
| Win
| align=center| 5–0
| Karine Gevorgyan
| Submission (heel hook)
| Mix Fight Events
| 
| align=center| 3
| align=center| 1:23
| La Nucia, Spain
|
|-
| Win
| align=center| 4–0
| Valérie Domergue
| Decision (unanimous)
| Hit Fighting Championship 2
| 
| align=center| 3
| align=center| 5:00
| Zurich, Switzerland
|
|-
| Win
| align=center| 3–0
| Lilla Vincze
| TKO (punches)
| Ladies Fight Night 2
| 
| align=center| 1
| align=center| 2:15
| Łódź, Poland
|
|-
| Win
| align=center| 2–0
| Camilla Hinze
| Decision (split)
| Trophy MMA 8: Easter Bash 2
| 
| align=center| 3
| align=center| 5:00
| Malmö, Sweden
|
|-
| Win
| align=center| 1–0
| Anne Merkt
| Decision (unanimous)
| We Love MMA 20
| 
| align=center| 3
| align=center| 5:00
| Munich, Germany
|
|-

|-
| Win
|align=center| 2–0
| Chrissy Audin
| KO (head kick)
| Say Uncle 2
| 
|align=center| 1
|align=center| 0:24
| Sheffield, England
|
|-
| Win
|align=center| 1–0
| Angela Danzig
| TKO (head kick and punches)
| MMA Battle Arena - Team USA vs. Team UK
| 
|align=center| 2
|align=center| 1:15
| Leicester, England
|
|-

See also 

 List of current UFC fighters

References

External links 
 
 

1995 births
Bantamweight mixed martial artists
Flyweight mixed martial artists
Living people
Sportspeople from Caracas
Venezuelan female karateka
Venezuelan people of Portuguese descent
Venezuelan female taekwondo practitioners
Portuguese female taekwondo practitioners
Venezuelan jujutsuka
Portuguese jujutsuka
Portuguese female mixed martial artists
Venezuelan female mixed martial artists
Mixed martial artists utilizing taekwondo
Mixed martial artists utilizing karate
Mixed martial artists utilizing jujutsu
Ultimate Fighting Championship female fighters